is a Japanese biathlete. He competed in the men's 20 km individual event at the 2006 Winter Olympics.

References

1980 births
Living people
Japanese male biathletes
Olympic biathletes of Japan
Biathletes at the 2006 Winter Olympics
Sportspeople from Aomori Prefecture
Asian Games medalists in biathlon
Biathletes at the 2007 Asian Winter Games
Asian Games silver medalists for Japan
Medalists at the 2007 Asian Winter Games